Saïd Berioui (born 3 June 1975 in Nador) is a retired Moroccan long-distance runner who specialized in the 10,000 metres.

International competitions

Personal bests
3000 metres – 7:41.83 min (2003)
5000 metres – 13:15.10 min (1999)
10,000 metres – 27:31.00 min (1998)

External links

1975 births
Living people
People from Nador
Moroccan male long-distance runners
French male long-distance runners
Olympic athletes of Morocco
Athletes (track and field) at the 2000 Summer Olympics
World Athletics Championships athletes for Morocco
Mediterranean Games bronze medalists for Morocco
Mediterranean Games medalists in athletics
Athletes (track and field) at the 1997 Mediterranean Games